Samuel Okon Peter  (born September 6, 1980) is a Nigerian professional boxer. He held the WBC heavyweight title in 2008, when he stopped Oleg Maskaev in six rounds. In his prime, he was known for his rivalry with the Klitschko brothers, having faced Wladimir twice (in 2005 and 2010) and Vitali once. He was ranked by The Ring among ten best heavyweights from 2005 to 2008, reaching his highest ranking of world No.2 in 2007, and by BoxRec as the world's No.6 heavyweight at the conclusion of 2004 and 2005 and as No.5 heavyweight in 2006. Peter is known for his punching power and holds a 78.9% knockout-to-win ratio.

Early years and amateur career

Originally, Peter's preferred sport was football. In 1992, some boxers came to his school to train. The curious young 11-year-old stopped by and asked if he could train along with them. He was put up against an experienced amateur and knocked him out. This marked the beginning of a successful amateur career for Peter.

He won the Nigerian Amateur Heavyweight Championship and the Africa Zone 3 Heavyweight Championship. He faced stiff competition as an amateur (including a knockout victory over 2000 silver medalist Mukhtarkhan Dildabekov of Kazakhstan).  However, he prevailed and was given the opportunity to represent Nigeria at the 2000 Summer Olympics in Sydney, Australia.

Peter lost in the quarterfinals to Italian Paolo Vidoz by decision. However, his performance was noted for being very impressive from such a young pugilist and hence more excitement was generated for him than the eventual gold medalist, Audley Harrison, to whom Peter had lost a very close decision just a few months before the Olympics.

Professional career

Early career 
Immediately after the Olympics, Ivaylo Gotzev signed on as Peter's manager, and Andy "Pops" Anderson became his coach. They were then able to land a promotional deal with Dino Duva of Duva Boxing.

Peter made his professional debut on February 6, 2001 against Bulgarian fighter Georgi Hristov in Almaty, Kazakhstan. Peter won the bout by first-round knockout. He had seven fights in 2001, winning all of them but one in the first-round. Peter made a step up in competition the following year, as his first fight of the year was against Marion Wilson. The bout was scheduled for four rounds. With 11–37–3 record, Wilson was known for his durability and toughness, having never lost inside the distance and occasionally pulling upsets, such as wins over Corey Sanders and Paea Wolfgramm or split draw against Ray Mercer. Peter won the bout by unanimous decision.

Peter had his next fight 19 days later against Julius Joiner (2–0–1, 1 KOs). This was Peter's first televised fight, as it was aired on ESPN2. The bout was on the undercard of the event that had James Toney facing Sione Asipeli and Lamont Pearson facing Orlando Salido. Joiner did not come out for the second round, prompting the referee to declare Peter the winner by corner retirement. Peter had three more fights in 2002, winning each by second-round stoppage and having the former two televised by ESPN2.

Afterwards Peter did not enter the ring for 8 months before facing Dale Crowe for the WBC's Youth heavyweight title. 26-year old Crowe had a 24–6–2 (15 KOs) record coming into the fight and had only been stopped by DaVarryl Williamson. Crowe became notorious after the fight against former world heavyweight champion Greg Page, in which he pushed Page against the ropes, which resulted in Page ending up partially paralyzed. This was the first professional fight in Peter's career scheduled for 10 rounds. The event was aired on ESPN2. Peter won every round on all scorecards before stopping Crowe in the fourth round.

Peter returned to the ring three months later, facing Lyle McDowell (27–9–1, 18 KOs) on June 21, 2003 in a fight televised by HBO as part of the card that saw Lennox Lewis facing Vitali Klitschko in the main event. Peter stopped McDowell in the fourth round. Peter finished the year with two second-round stoppages, boosting his record to 16 wins in 16 fights, with 15 of them inside the distance. He signed to fight Lawrence Clay-Bey (18–2, 13 KOs) in December in a bout televised by ESPN, however Clay-Bey pulled out of the fight due to injury. Dino Duva accused Clay-Bey of faking an injury to avoid fighting Samuel Peter.

Peter vs. Shufford, Pudar 

After scoring two back-to-back stoppage wins against Chris Isaac and Jose Arimatea da Silva, with the former being the first time Peter went past fifth round, Peter took a big step up in competition when he faced former WBO world heavyweight title challenger Charles Shufford on May 17, 2004. This was the first time Peter was in the main event of a card. The event was the third installment of Heavyweight Heroes: the Search for the Next Great Heavyweight, a monthly PPV boxing series created by Cedric Kushner Promotions and broadcast on In Demand for $19.95. Shufford had a record of 20–5, 9 KOs coming into the bout and was 3–3 in his last six fights. Peter won the bout by unanimous decision, going ten rounds for the first time in his career. Three judges scored the bout 99–91, 98–92 and 97–93. According to CompuBox, Peter landed more total and power punches than Shufford in every round; overall, Peter threw 569 shots (32.2% accuracy), with 277 of them being power punches (46.2% accuracy).

Three months later, Peter faced Serbian heavyweight Jovo Pudar on 5 August 2004 at Seminole Hard Rock Hotel & Casino in Hollywood, Florida. 33-year old Jovo Pudar had a record of 22–2 (12 KOs) coming into the bout and had never been stopped in his professional boxing career. He was 5–1 in his last six fights, with the only loss coming at the hands of Taurus Sykes. The fight was televised by Showtime as part of the ShoBox: The New Generation boxing program. In the build-up to the fight, Ivaylo Gotzev claimed that this fight would finally establish Peter as "the next true heavyweight king in the minds of boxing fans": "enough about Dominick Guinn and Joe Mesi and all the rest of them; tune in August 5. I guarantee Samuel Peter will be explosive!" He also expressed his interest in Lawrence Clay-Bey, who was coming off of a fifth-round TKO win over former IBF world cruiserweight champion Imamu Mayfield, as Peter's next opponent. 

Although Peter was unable to stop Pudar, he bloodied his nose, eventually winning a unanimous decision. Three judges scored the bout 100–90 (twice) and 98–92. According to CompuBox, there were 1,281 punches thrown between two fighters. Peter connected on 239 shots out of 690, while Pudar landed 162 punches out of 591. Peter outlanded his opponent in each round but third and ninth (even) and connected on more power shots in all of the ten rounds.

Peter vs. Williams, Diaz 

To conclude 2004, Peter agreed to face former WBO world heavyweight title challenger Jeremy Williams (41–4–1, 35 KOs) on December 4, 2004 at Mandalay Bay Resort & Casino in Las Vegas, Nevada. With a record of 6–0–1, 4 KOs in his last seven fights, Williams was seen to had put his losses to Henry Akinwande and Brian Nielsen behind him, scoring back-to-back upset victories against rising prospects Andre Purlette (35–1, 32 KOs) and Attila Levin (29–1, 23 KOs) and drawing against former IBF world cruiserweight champion Al Cole. The bout took place on the undercard of Jose Luis Castillo vs. Joel Casamayor and was aired on Showtime.

Both boxers started the fight aggressively. After back-and-forth trading in the opening seconds, Williams retreated onto the outside, at first attempting to bob-and-weave but then changing his tactics to circling around Peter and working behind the jab after the bob-and-weave strategy didn't work. Meanwhile Peter was stalking his opponent across the ring, fighting his way inside and putting heavy pressure on Williams' body whenever Williams was at mid-range. With 20 seconds into the second round, Peter threw a one-two combination; as Williams ducked under Peter's right hand, Peter turned around and landed a left hook while Williams was square-footed and moving out of the mid-range. Williams was out cold for several minutes. Peter was declared the winner by second-round knockout, winning the vacant WBC-NABF heavyweight title. The win was nominated for the Knockout of the Year by ESPN. By December 2004, Peter was ranked No.9 contender by the WBC.

On January 22, 2005, Peter faced Cuban heavyweight Yanqui Díaz, who had a record 13–1, 8 KOs coming into the bout. This was the second time Peter was scheduled to fight in a twelve-round bout. Díaz was a highly regarded prospect due to his long and decorated amateur career, with boxing manager Wes Wolfe predicting he would become "a superstar among the Cubans". After an unexpected loss against Tony Thompson, Díaz went on a 5-fight winning streak, which included an upset first-round TKO against undefeated former long-reigning WBC world cruiserweight champion Juan Carlos Gomez and a split-decision victory over Vaughn Bean. He was ranked No.13 contender by the WBO by January 2005. The bout took place on the undercard of Floyd Mayweather Jr. vs. Henry Bruseles and was aired on HBO. 

The fight saw Peter patiently stalking Díaz across the ring and finding his way inside while Díaz tried to stay on the outside, fight behind the jab and circle around his heavier opponent. In the first round, Peter sent Díaz down with a right hand. He did it again in the second but was deducted two points for intentionally hitting Díaz while he was down. In the fourth round, Peter pinned Díaz against the ropes and eventually knocked him down. Díaz got up but was sent to the canvas with a left hook to the body. Peter dropped Díaz for the fifth time in the following round, which prompted Díaz's corner to throw in the towel. By defeating Díaz, Peter won the vacant IBF-USBA heavyweight title. By April 2005, Peter was ranked No.5 contender by the WBC, No.6 by the WBO and No.9 by the IBF.

On April 29, 2005, he defeated a journeyman Gilbert Martinez (18–8–3, 7 KOs) by third round TKO in a stay busy fight televised by ESPN2 as part of the Friday Night Fights series. By June, Peter was ranked No.9 heavyweight contender by The Ring. He was also ranked No.4 by the WBC and No.5 by both the IBF and WBO. Having a record of 23–0, 20 KOs, Peter was predicted to have a bright future in the heavyweight division, with the media often comparing him to Mike Tyson due to his build and punching power. When interviewed by ESPN in 2005, Mike Tyson picked Peter and Calvin Brock as his favorite fighters from the new crop of heavyweights.

Peter vs. Sykes 

Less than three months later, Peter went on to face WBA-NABA heavyweight champion Taurus Sykes (23–1–1, 6 KOs) in Reno, Nevada on July 2, 2005. This was the first time Peter headlined a card televised by Showtime. The event was part of the Showtime Championship Boxing program. Sykes was 5–0–1 in his last six fights, most notably defeating another Nigerian heavyweight Friday Ahunanya by decision in a competitive bout and scoring a draw against Imamu Mayfield. In the build-up to the fight, Sykes accused Peter of ducking the fight with him previously. The pre-fight conference call saw a clash of words between both fighters, with Sykes continuing to insult Peter: "I know I am being underestimated, but it is all good. It has been like this my whole career. Everybody I have fought was supposed to beat me, but I came out on top. [...] I will outsmart him and outthink him. I am going to be a slick, crafty boxer. I know that he has never really fought anybody like that. Everybody he has fought is running from him, looking to get a check and leave. [...] Sam is getting all hyped. That is how I am going to take him out of the fight. I am going to bust him down and then I will just walk away with a smile." 

The bout lasted two rounds. The opening round saw Sykes attempting to stay away from Peter by circling around, working behind the jab and mostly throwing one-two combinations, while Peter was working his way inside, going back-and-forth between combinations to the head and body and trying to press Sykes against the ropes. The same pattern continued in the following round. In the middle of the second round, Peter hurt Sykes with a right hook as Sykes attempted to initiate a clinch. Peter immediately followed with a barrage of punches, not allowing Sykes to stay away and recover from the punch, ultimately knocking him down with one minute left. Sykes was not able to get up, prompting the referee to stop the fight and declare Peter the winner.  With a win over Sykes, Peter became the holder of regional titles of three major sanctioning bodies – IBF, WBA and WBC. As of August 2005, Peter, already ranked by the WBC, IBF and WBO, was ranked No.9 by the WBA.

Peter vs. Wladimir Klitschko
On September 24, 2005 he faced Wladimir Klitschko in an elimination match in Atlantic City for the IBF title, in which Peter's WBC-NABF title was also on the line. Coming into the bout, Klitschko was viewed by many as the underdog against the 7-to-5 favorite Peter who had won all of his 24 fights, with 21 of them having ended inside the distance. Coming into the fight, Samuel Peter was considered one of the brightest prospects in the heavyweight division. Distinguished boxing coaches Angelo Dundee and Teddy Atlas expected Peter to win. Wladimir's team, including his brother Vitali, were worried about Wladimir, and were against this fight to happen. Wladimir, however, insisted on fighting Peter, claiming that beating a feared, hard-hitting fighter like Samuel Peter would help him to regain his stock and become mandatory challenger for two heavyweight belts.

The first four rounds were tentative, with Peter not being to close the distance. At the end of the third, Peter staggered Klitschko with a powerful left hook. He hurt Klitschko again in the fifth with another left hook, sending Klitschko to the canvas with the rabbit punch. The referee counted it as the knockdown. Peter immediately went for the attack after Klitschko got up, dropping him again with the rabbit punch. The referee scored it as the second knockdown. Peter was outboxed through sixth to ninth rounds, frequently trying to hit Klitschko with the rabbit punch whenever escaping from a clinch. Near the end of the tenth round Peter staggered Wladimir with a hard right hand, eventually sending Klitschko to the canvas with another right when Wladimir was backing away. In the 11th and 12th rounds, Klitschko was trying to keep Peter at the distance using straight punches. Peter caught Klitschko with a left hook in the last round, but was unable to capitalize on it. Instead, Klitschko caught him with a hard counter left hook of his own, staggering Peter for the first time in the fight.

Eventually the bout went the distance, with Peter losing the fight by unanimous decision (UD). All the judges scored the bout identically 114–111.

Peter vs. Hawkins, Long
Less than three months later after losing to Klitschko, on December 15, 2005, Peter faced Robert Hawkins (21–4–0, 7 KOs) in a stay-busy fight where the WBA-NABA title was also on the line. The bout was a part of the heavyweight triple-header which also saw undefeated Sultan Ibragimov facing Lance Whitaker, with Peter's promoter Ivaylo Gotzev expecting the winners of the two bouts to face each other in the near future. "Robert Hawkins is a tough and credible fighter", Dino Duva said in the build-up to the fight, "This fight proves Sam Peter is a true warrior not afraid of anyone." The event billed as "Global Warfare" took place at Seminole Hard Rock Hotel & Casino Hollywood and was televised on In-Demand PPV for $19.95.

The bout started with aggressive approach by Peter. He knocked Hawkins down midway through the first round but was more cautious afterwards, patiently stalking Hawkins across the ring and fighting behind the jab. The bout was interrupted in the fourth round after Sultan Ibragimov's coach Panama Lewis collapsed due to a heart failure. The delay lasted 11 minutes. After the action resumed, the following round only lasted one minute. After the sixth round, Peter was forced to fight with a split down the back of his trunks. Peter stepped up his aggression after the seventh round. Hawkins fought most of the fight on the back foot and appeared to be unable to withstand Peter's pressure. Ultimately the bout went the distance, with Peter being declared the winner. The judges scored the bout 99–90 (twice) and 98-91, all in favor of Peter. At the conclusion of 2005, Peter was ranked No.9 heavyweight in the world by The Ring. BoxRec ranked Peter as the world's No.6 heavyweight.

On April 28, 2006, Peter faced 7'11" journeyman Julius Long (14–7, 12 KOs) for the NABF heavyweight title, despite the fact that Long was unranked by the WBC, in a bout televised by ESPN. Long was 4–2 in his last six fights, coming off of a UD loss to Terry Smith (24–1–1, 16 KOs). Peter was viewed as the heavy favorite against Long who, despite his size, was mostly an inside fighter and threw punches under unusual angles. Peter made a quick work of Long, dropping him 80 seconds into the first round and then again clobbering him by a three-punch combination, which resulted in Long collapsing face first on the canvas, prompting the referee to stop the fight.

Peter vs. Toney I, II
His next bout was a fight with heavyweight contender James Toney on September 2, 2006 at the Staples Center in Los Angeles for the right to challenge WBC heavyweight champion Oleg Maskaev. Peter would win by split decision; however, the WBC would find adequate cause to order a rematch.

For this fight against Toney, Manny Masson was brought in to train Peter.

On January 6, 2007, Peter defeated Toney in the rematch by unanimous decision (UD). The official judges' scorecards read 119–108, 118–110, 118–110.

Peter vs. McCline
After defeating Toney, he had earned the right to challenge the WBC heavyweight champion. A match against Oleg Maskaev was scheduled for October 6, 2007. However, Maskaev pulled out of the fight due to a back injury. This led the WBC to proclaim Peter their interim heavyweight champion.

Jameel McCline was scheduled to fight Vitali Klitschko on September 22 for a title elimination. However, the fight was canceled because Klitschko had suffered a back injury in training. Under these conditions, a fight was arranged between Peter and McCline. Peter stepped into the ring as the champion trying to defend his title. Much controversy preceded the match since McCline had been accused of using illegal substances in 2005 and 2006, but the organizers decided to let the fight happen despite this. Lab analysis would be available about 5 days after the fight. Peter almost pulled out of the fight due to a hand injury he had sustained due to inadequate hand-wrapping during his training camp in the Poconos but the situation was resolved when Manny Masson took complete control of Peter's hand-wrapping.

On October 6 at Madison Square Garden, Peter was knocked down 3 times in the second and third round by McCline, who had a height advantage of almost 6 inches. Though he seemed badly hurt in the third round, Peter managed to get up and eventually won the remaining rounds to win the match with a unanimous decision and retain his title as the WBC interim heavyweight title. As in the second Toney fight the key to Peter's victory was the use of his triple jab, footwork, head movement, and combination punching which is also attributable to his trainer Manny Masson. He kept Mccline off with the jab and then forced him backwards in the final minute of each round to score points. Mccline was perhaps tired from throwing so many power punches early on. Nevertheless, Peter outworked him for the better part of nine rounds.

WBC heavyweight champion
As interim champion, he was a mandatory challenger for the WBC belt held by Oleg Maskaev, who had been inactive since December 2006 due to injury. This long-anticipated fight took place on March 8, 2008, at the principal bullfighting venue in Cancún, Mexico. Peter won by TKO, with the referee stopping the fight with only a few seconds remaining in the sixth round. Peter used far less movement than he had in his previous two bouts against Maskaev, from the first round onwards both were trading heavy shots. In round three Peter staggered Maskaev and was then rocked in return. Maskaev had not been able to really hurt Peter. Peter used his jab to pursue Maskaev in the sixth and eventually broke through with a big right hand. Maskaev staggered backwards and Peter moved in for the finish. Peter continued to pummel Maskaev on the ropes while Oleg tried to motion to the referee about rabbit punches. The referee stepped in with seconds remaining as Maskaev staggered backwards into the corner. Peter was ahead on all three judges' scorecards at the time of the stoppage.

Peter vs. Vitali Klitschko
Following his victory over Maskaev, he publicly challenged IBF, WBO and IBO champion Wladimir Klitschko to a unification bout, which would have been Klitschko's second such fight, as well as his second matchup with Peter (the first ending with a unanimous decision victory for Klitschko). Such a fight would have unified three of the four major titles, the closest the division had been to an undisputed champion since Lennox Lewis relinquished the WBA title (one of the three he then held) by court order on April 29, 2000. Klitschko indicated he might fight Peter, but suggested that Peter should fight his brother Vitali first. Vitali Klitschko had retired as WBC champion in November 2005, and was considered the WBC's champion emeritus, giving him the right to a mandatory challenge under the rules of that organization should he elect to fight again. At the time of his retirement, Vitali was the dominant force in his division. Both had a claim to being the rightful WBC belt holder. Yet there was added importance for the bout; if Vitali were to win it would mean that both brothers would achieve their dream of being heavyweight champions at the same time. On the other hand, if Peter were to win and then challenge Wladimir in a rematch, it would bring the heavyweight division close to the first undisputed title holder in years. Peter accepted the WBC's ruling and the bout was scheduled for October 11 at O2 World Berlin.

Klitschko had a memorable ring entrance with five former heavyweight champions appearing to wish him luck in his comeback. Klitschko would reclaim his belt in dominating fashion. Although he was coming back from a four-year layoff, Klitschko was sharp from the opening bell. Peter had been expected to set the pace and pursue Vitali, instead he spent time outside trying to box his way in. Klitschko took the center of the ring and found Peter an easy target. Peter landed two hard right hands in the second round, but they had almost no effect on Vitali at all. After four rounds Peter's face was swelling and his corner was growing in frustration. His corner implored him to let his hands go and push Vitali back. Peter tried to rally in the sixth round, but only made himself an even more open target for Klitschko's counter punches. The seventh round was extremely punishing for the defending champion as he ate several left hooks, right crosses and jabs. Peter seemed unresponsive to his corner's advice after a few rounds. As his corner tried to give him instructions the scores of the fight were read out by the ring announcer. Two judges had Klitschko ahead by 80–72, and one by 79–73. Peter informed he did not wish to continue, prompting the referee to stop the fight and declare Klitschko the winner.

After Klitschko: defeat to Chambers and return to form
Looking to bounce back to the heavyweight title picture, Peter faced Eddie Chambers on March 27, 2009. The fight took place at Nokia Theatre in Los Angeles, and was aired on ESPN2. Chambers injured his right thumb early in the third round, but was able to outbox Peter for the majority of the fight, frustrating his opponent with speed and quickness and being able to block most of Peter's shots using his gloves and armes. As a result, Chambers was declared the winner by majority decision, with the judges scoring the bout 99–91, 96–94 and 95–95. Some observers criticized the 95–95 score, believing Peter had not done enough to win more than three rounds.

He fought Marcus McGee on July 25, 2009 in Mexico, knocking him unconscious in the third round with a right hand. He weighed in at a 243 lbs for this fight.

His next fight was on September 15, 2009 against the little known Ronald Bellamy. Peter won by second-round knockout. He then fought journeyman Gabe Brown and won by fourth round stoppage.

Following his three successful victories over journeymen, Peter took a step up in competition against Nagy Aguilera in an IBF eliminator (Aguilera had earned the position with a stunning first-round knockout of former champion Oleg Maskaev). Peter came in at 237 pounds, the lightest since his seventh pro fight. He dominated an entertaining first round before sending Aguilera down in the second with a right hand counter, Nagy beat the count but was stopped soon after as he was hanging against the ropes, taking heavy shots.

Peter then targeted either a rematch with Wladimir Klitschko or a final IBF eliminator with unbeaten Alexander Povetkin. Sensing that Povetkin was not willing to fight Klitschko, Peter made himself available as a replacement opponent. Both Peter and Povetkin were ranked as #1 IBF contenders.

Peter vs. Wladimir Klitschko II and release from Top Rank
On September 11, 2010, Peter fought Wladimir Klitschko again at the Commerzbank Arena in Frankfurt, Germany, for the IBF, WBO, and IBO heavyweight titles. Peter weighed in at 241 pounds, two pounds lighter than the first fight. Klitschko came in at a career heavy of 247 pounds. Both fighters had promised knockouts in the pre fight build up. Peter started the fight very aggressively in a bob and weave style he had never before fought in. He caught Klitschko with a good left hook in the opening round, though Klitschko remained unshaken. Klitschko ended the round well. In the second round Klitschko caught Peter with three hard right hands, one of which seemed to stun him. Both fighters struggled to land punches in the third round, there was a lot of clinching in what was a physical encounter. Unlike their first fight referee Robert Byrd did not let Peter punch on the break or hit to the back of the head. After four rounds the fight became one sided, with Peter's right eye closing. Peter could not find the target and started lunging with wild shots, his legs had slowed dramatically and he was taking heavy shots. He did get through with a big right hand in round six though. Klitschko, instead of going backwards as he did in their first fight, would meet Peter in the middle of the ring and dominate him physically in the clinches. Peter was taking heavy punishment and after eight rounds was totally exhausted. After the ninth round Peter's cornerman Abel Sanchez threatened to stop the fight, and said he would give him one more round. Emanuel Steward implored Klitschko to throw combinations. Peter swung wildly in the tenth and Klitschko opened up with a punishing combination which floored him. Referee Robert Byrd did not start a count and waved the fight off, awarding Klitschko the win by knockout. It was Klitschko's ninth successful title defense. 

The nature of the defeat to Klitschko in the rematch possibly spelled the end of Peter's career as a top level fighter. Top Rank released him from his contract soon after. In spite of this Peter's manager said they would look to secure other big fights in the division against anyone other than the Klitschko brothers.

Peter vs. Helenius
After his release from Top Rank, Peter and his management sent an offer to Tomasz Adamek for an IBF elimination match. The fight fell through when Peter refused Adamek's challenger money of $150,000. Peter then went into negotiations for a fight with Tye Fields which also failed to materialise. Then, in March 2011, it was revealed that Peter would travel to Germany to face undefeated Finnish prospect Robert Helenius. Peter was rumoured to be in training with Jeff Mayweather, however, Mayweather was not present for Peter's fight against Helenius. Peter was without a reputed trainer or even a cutman for the fight. Peter had reasonable success in the first half of the bout, winning several of the first six rounds; however, after that point Peter began to tire. The end came when Helenius knocked down an exhausted Peter in round nine, Peter got to his feet only to be sent back to the canvas where he remained for well over the 10 second count, awarding Helenius the win by KO. The nature of the loss to Helenius, as well as Peter's terrible physical condition led many to call for Peter's retirement from boxing.

2014 return 
Peter made an unexpected return to the ring on September 27, 2014 to face journeyman Ron Aubrey. Peter ended the fight when a vicious right hook knocked Aubrey unconscious in the first round.

Fight cancellations
During his four-year period of near total inactivity, Peter had been signed to fight several opponents with all the bouts being cancelled. He was scheduled to compete in the Super 8 boxing tournament, but pulled out due to injury. He was then scheduled to face former title challenger Alex Leapai but once again he pulled out as the fight neared. He then signed to fight Alexander Ustinov but again cancelled the fight with only days to go. Peter was close to agreeing to fight Luis Ortiz before eventually being replaced.

Career from 2016–present 
At the age of 36, after a two-year layoff, Peter returned to the ring on October 23 fighting in Mexico, defeating unknown boxer Juan Carlos Salas (6–9) in three rounds. Peter weighed 262-pounds. It was still unclear if Peter would be returning to boxing full-time.

On November 1, there were early talks that Peter would be fighting former world title challenger Kubrat Pulev in December in Sofia, Bulgaria. Pulev, ranked at number 2 with the IBF, recently defeated Derek Chisora via decision in May. A fight was confirmed five days later by Team Sauerland, officially announcing the fight between Peter and Pulev on December 3 in Bulgaria. This would be a stay busy fight for Pulev before his anticipated European title defense against Polish boxer Mariusz Wach. Pulev vacated his European title on November 22. In front of 15,000 at the Arena Armeec, Pulev defeated Peter via fourth round corner retirement (RTD) to win the vacant WBA Inter-Continental heavyweight title. Peter was aggressive throughout but struggled with Pulev's jab. The fight was stopped after round three when Peter dislocated his right shoulder while throwing a big punch. He went back to the corner leaning towards the right side and the injury forced him to retire.

Peter returned to Mexico once again on February 22, 2019 having not fought in two years. He appeared at the Cheers Bar & Grill in Tijuana knocking out Gerardo Escobar in just 44 seconds of the fight starting. On March 26 Peter signed a promotional contract with Salita Promotions and was announced to fight Mexican journeyman Mario Heredia (15–6–1, 13 KOs) on April 13 at the Boardwalk Hall in Atlantic City on the undercard of Claressa Shields vs. Christina Hammer. Prior to the fight, Heredia was 2–5–1 in his previous eight bouts. Peter lost an eight-round split decision to Heredia, which took place at the Adrian Phillips Theater. Peter scored a knockdown in round-three yet was unable to finish Heredia, who fought on and prevailed by scores of 77–74 and 76–75, with the third judge giving Peter the nod via a 79–72 margin.

Outside the ring
Peter is a devout Christian who neither drinks nor smokes. He lives in Las Vegas, Nevada.

He is managed by Ivailo Gotsev, and is a stablemate to former WBO heavyweight champion Sergei Liakhovich. Peter was formerly promoted by both Duva Boxing and Don King. Originally trained by Andy "Pops" Anderson, he has since gone on to work with former champion Cornelius Boza-Edwards. He also worked with technical specialist and strategist Manny Masson who assisted in the training for his two decisive victories against James Toney and Jameel McCline. Peter is currently trained by Ibn Cason.

Following his split with Duva boxing, he had a court case against Don King over a dispute in the purse bid for his title loss to Vitali Klitschko.

He challenged American Champion Chris Arreola to a bout in 2009. Claiming that Arreola had stolen his "nightmare" nickname. Peter said that if the fight went through then the loser would have to change his moniker.

Peter is the nephew of Nigerian professional wrestler Great Power Uti.

Professional boxing record

Television viewership

Germany

Nigeria

United States

References

External links

Nigerian expatriates in the United States
World Boxing Council champions
Olympic boxers of Nigeria
Boxers at the 2000 Summer Olympics
1980 births
Living people
Nigerian male boxers
World heavyweight boxing champions
American male boxers